Marianne Weinås (born 27 March 1963) is a Swedish former diver. She competed in the women's 10 metre platform event at the 1984 Summer Olympics.

References

External links
 

1963 births
Living people
Swedish female divers
Olympic divers of Sweden
Divers at the 1984 Summer Olympics
Divers from Gothenburg
20th-century Swedish women
21st-century Swedish women